Jack Richards may refer to:
 Jack Richards (cricketer, born 1958), English cricketer
 Jack Richards (cricketer, born 1918), English cricketer and British Army officer
 Jack C. Richards, applied linguist from New Zealand

See also
 A Year in the Death of Jack Richards, a 2004 Canadian psychological drama film